Joan Simon (1915–2005) was an English historian, specializing in education, the wife and close collaborator of the educationist and historian Brian Simon.

Joan Peel was born in 1915, a direct descendant of the 19th-century prime minister, Robert Peel.
She met her future husband Brian Simon while he was studying at Trinity College, Cambridge.
They married in 1941, and had two sons, Alan and Martin.
They entered into a close partnership in their work, which continued until Brian's death in January 2002.
It was said of Brian that " his partnership with Joan Simon cannot be extracted from Brian’s work as a whole".

In the 1950s, she and her husband Brian investigated, described and publicized the views of A. R. Luria and L. S. Vygotskii, founders of cultural-historical psychology in the then Soviet Union.
In the Autumn of 1958 Brian was one of the founders of FORUM, a journal devoted to educational issues. 
She published articles in FORUM in 1964 and 1965 describing developments in comprehensive education in Bradford, Sheffield, Liverpool and Manchester.
In 1973 the magazine published a pamphlet written by Joan titled Indictment of Margaret Thatcher, Secretary of State 1970–1973.
In 1986 she published a biography of her mother in law, Shena Simon, who had been active in education reform in England in the 1930s and 1940s.

Joan Simon continued to work until a few months before her death in 2005.
In 2007 the journal History of Education posthumously published her last article: An 'energetic and controversial' historian of education yesterday and today: A. F. Leach (1851–1915).

Bibliography

References

1915 births
2005 deaths
English educational theorists